The 2018–19 Evansville Purple Aces women's basketball team represents the University of Evansville during the 2018–19 NCAA Division I women's basketball season. The Purple Aces, led by third year head coach Matt Ruffing, play their home games at Meeks Family Fieldhouse and were members of the Missouri Valley Conference. They finished the season 4–26, 2–16 in MVC play to finish in last place. They lost in the first round of the Missouri Valley women's tournament to Loyola–Chicago.

Roster

Schedule

|-
!colspan=9 style=| Exhibition

|-
!colspan=9 style=| Non-conference regular season

|-
!colspan=9 style=| Missouri Valley regular season

|-
!colspan=12 style=| Missouri Valley Women's Tournament

See also
2018–19 Evansville Purple Aces men's basketball team

References

Evansville Purple Aces women's basketball seasons
Evansville
Evansville Purple Aces women's
Evansville Purple Aces women's